Walter Davis may refer to:

Politics
 Walter Scott Davis (1866–1943), Washington state senator
 Walter Naylor Davis (1876–1951), Missouri Democrat
 Walter Davis (politician) (1915–1971), Australian

Sports
 Walter Davis (basketball) (born 1954), American
 Walter Davis (footballer) (1888–1937), British
 Walter Davis (rugby union), Australian
 Walter Davis (triple jumper) (born 1979), American
 Steel Arm Davis (Walter C. Davis, 1896–1941), American Negro league baseball player
 Walter S. Davis (1905–1979), American football coach for Tennessee State
 Walt Davis (1931–2020), American basketball player and high-jumper

Other
 Walter Davis (botanist) (1847–1930), British
 Walter Davis (blues) (1911–1963), blues singer and pianist
 Walter Davis Jr. (1932–1990), jazz pianist
 Walter A. Davis (born 1942), American philosopher, critic, and writer
 Walter J. Davis Jr. (born 1936), U.S. naval aviator and vice admiral
 Walter R. Davis (1920–2008), Texas oil tycoon and philanthropist
 Walter Davis, Illinois mechanic who assisted in Abraham Lincoln's patent

See also
 Walter Davies (disambiguation)